Orientalosuchus is an extinct genus of alligatoroid crocodilian from the Late Eocene that was found in the Na Duong Formation in Vietnam.

The type species naduongensis was named after the location where it was found in Northeastern Vietnam, near the Chinese border.  The Na Duong Formation is dated to the middle to late Eocene (late Bartonian to Priabonian), from 39 to 35 million years ago.  Twenty-nine well preserved individual fossils were recovered in the area from 2009 to 2012.

The new genus Orientalosuchus was named in a 2019 study by Massonne et al. that also included several other extinct alligatoroid taxa from Asia. Phylogenetic analysis found that they were all closely related and together formed a monophyletic clade (newly named Orientalosuchina) as basal members of Alligatoroidea, as shown in the cladogram below:

References

Crocodilians
Prehistoric pseudosuchian genera